St. Joseph's Secondary School is an all-girls school in Navan, Ireland. It serves both the town and a large catchment area. The school is situated close to Railway Street and shares part of its grounds with St. Joseph's Primary School. It was founded by the Sisters of Mercy.

As of 2020, the principal is Rita Meagher and the vice-principals are Claire D'Arcy and Fiona Daly. The school has approximately 700 students and has a range of extra curricular activities which include music and choir, drama, debating, equestrian and golf.

History
In 1925, the school was registered as a secondary school with the approval of the Department of Education. Many of the students educated at St. Joseph’s from the 1920s onwards entered Teacher Training Colleges or University or went on to work in the Civil Service. During the 1960s, it became increasingly evident that a new school would have to be built as student numbers continued to grow. In an effort to support the work of the Sisters, a Parents Association was formed to raise funds for the building project. A government grant was made available and in 1969 the main block of St. Joseph’s Secondary School, as we know it, was officially opened.

In 2007, the school began operating under the trusteeship of CEIST Catholic Education an Irish Schools Trust.

Mission statement
St Joseph’s Mercy Secondary School states that it is 'informed and influenced by the teaching and example of Jesus Christ and is conducted in an atmosphere of care, respect and joy.'

References

External links
 St Joseph's Secondary School site

Secondary schools in County Meath
Girls' schools in the Republic of Ireland
Educational institutions established in 1853
Catholic secondary schools in the Republic of Ireland
Sisters of Mercy schools
1853 establishments in Ireland